Julio César Aguirre Méndez (born 14 September 1962) is a Mexican politician affiliated with the Party of the Democratic Revolution. As of 2014 he served as Senator of the LXI Legislature of the Mexican Congress of the Mexican Congress representing Guerrero as replacement of Lázaro Mazón Alonso.

References

1962 births
Living people
Politicians from Guerrero
Members of the Senate of the Republic (Mexico)
Party of the Democratic Revolution politicians
21st-century Mexican politicians